Malani Bulathsinhala (12 December 1949 - 29 March 2001) was a Sri Lankan singer. She began her musical career at age 10 with the Sri Lanka Broadcasting Corporation.

Personal life

Bulathsinhala was born on 12 December 1949, in Boralesgamuwa, the oldest child of Wilson and P. K. Bulathsinhala. She had two siblings, a brother, Sireshan, and sister, Sandhya. She completed her education at the Papiliyana Beacon School for Girls. She also served as Assistant Director of Education in the western Sri Lankan province of Sri Jayawardenepura Kotte.

She married fellow musician Hearth Muidiyanselage Jayawardena on 30 December 1978, and was the mother of musician Kasun Kalhara. Her only daughter, Nirmani Chaya, died in 1991 at the age of three of dengue fever. 

Her younger sister, Sandhya, is also a singer. On 27 March 2016, her sister staged a concert, "Sandamadala", at the Kularatne Hall of Ananda College, Colombo, to commemorate Bulathsinhala's singing career.

Musical career
Bulathsinhala specialised in Indian classical and Oriental music. Bulathsinhala's first song to be aired on the radio was "Yala Yala Yala Yamu Saththu Balanna", a collaboration with Graeme Leonardos. Her first music teacher was Kamalini Perera. She joined the Lama Pitiya program at Sri Lanka Broadcasting Corporation (SLBC) as B. S. Malani. She later graduated from the State Song and Music College of Fine Arts before going to India to specialize in music at Bhatkhande Music Institute Deemed University. After returning to Sri Lanka, she became a school music teacher. 

During this period, she sang "Sanda Madale Sita" while participating in the Prabodha Gee radio program. She was also involved with the songs "Thun Ruwane Saranai", "Pipena Malakata" and "Himi Sanaramara", and wrote several duets with other singers, including "Dam Patin La" with Gunadasa Kapuge.

Death 
During a 2001 tour in the United States, Bulathsinhala was found dead in the bathroom of the residence of Sri Lanka consul Tissa Wijeratne. She was 51 years old. It is believed that her death was caused by anaphylaxis brought on by an allergic reaction to hair dye.

See also
 Nanda Malini
 Latha Walpola
 H. M. Jayawardena

External links
 A list of songs by Malani Bulathsinhala

References

20th-century Sri Lankan women singers
 Sinhalese singers
2001 deaths
1949 births
Sri Lankan expatriates in India
Indian classical musicians